Wilhelm Emil Fein (16 January 1842 – 6 October 1898) was a German inventor. He invented the worldwide first portable electric drill.

Life 

In 1867, he and his brother Carl founded their own company. In 1895, the first portable handheld drill was created by the two brothers. It was however not the first worldwide electric drill, which had been invented by Arthur Arnot in Australia six years earlier.

Works by Fein 

 Elektrische Apparate, Maschinen und Einrichtungen

Awards 
 1891: Württembergische Staatsmedaille für Kunst und Wissenschaft

External links 
 Deutsche Biographie:Wilhelm Emil Fein (German)

19th-century German inventors
German company founders
19th-century German businesspeople
1842 births
1898 deaths